House of the Dead is a 2003 action horror film directed by Uwe Boll, from a screenplay by Dave Parker and Mark Altman. Based on the video game franchise of the same name by Sega, it is not a direct adaptation of the individual entries; Boll described the film as a prequel to the original 1996 game. It stars Jonathan Cherry, Tyron Leitso, Clint Howard, Ona Grauer, Ellie Cornell, and Jürgen Prochnow. The film takes place on a fictional island infested by zombies, forcing survivors to fight their way off. House of the Dead was Boll's first film to be released theatrically, in addition to his first video game adaptation.

Upon release, House of the Dead was universally panned by critics, giving Boll a negative reputation that would continue throughout his career. Commercially, the film grossed $13.8 million on a $12 million budget. A sequel was released to home media in 2006, with only Cornell returning.

Plot
After booking a boat trip to attend a rave on an island located off the coast of Seattle named "Isla del Morte" ("Island of Death"), two college students, Simon and Greg meet up with three girls: Alicia, Karma and Greg's girlfriend Cynthia. After arriving at the dock, the five find that they are late and the boat that is supposed to take them to Isla del Morte has already left. Victor Kirk, a boat captain, and his first mate Salish offer them a ride on their boat.

Arriving at Isla del Morte, they find the rave site messed up and deserted. Alicia, Karma and Simon leave the site to go find anybody around while Cynthia and Greg stay behind. As Greg and Cynthia are about to engage in sex in a tent, the former leaves to urinate. Alone in the tent, Cynthia is killed by a group of zombies. Meanwhile, Alicia, Karma and Simon find a derelict house and as they attempt to investigate the place, they discover Alicia's ex-boyfriend Rudy, Liberty and Hugh, who inform them of a zombie attack during the rave. The six leave the house to fetch Greg and Cynthia. Meanwhile, the zombies kill Salish when he is alone in the forest.

Alicia, Rudy, Karma, Simon, Liberty and Hugh return to the rave site where they find Greg. A zombified Cynthia comes out from behind a tree and kills Hugh but is killed when Casper, a Coast Guard officer who was tracking Kirk, arrives and shoots her. They form a plan to return to Kirk's boat and leave the island. When they return to the beach they find zombies on Kirk's boat. Casper and Greg leave the group to go find help, but Greg is killed in the forest.

Kirk reveals the island's history; Isla del Morte was home to Castillo Sermano, a Spanish Catholic priest that was banished from Spain in the 15th century for his dark experiments, which the Catholic Church forbade. Castillo murdered the crew of St. Cristobal, the ship that was taking him to the island, enslaved the island's natives, and murdered anyone who visited the place. He then created an immortality serum which he injected himself with, allowing him to live forever and return dead souls to life and support his cause. Kirk leads the group to a spot in the forest where he has hidden a box full of guns and weaponry. Once everyone is armed, they decide to head back to the house only to find the courtyard filled with zombies. Liberty and Casper are killed in the ensuing fight and Alicia, Rudy, Kirk, Karma and Simon manage to take shelter inside the house.

When Kirk is alone, he hears Salish whistling outside. He goes outside and sees Salish now zombified. Kirk sacrifices himself by killing Salish and a bunch of zombies with a stick of dynamite, but the explosion also blows up the entrance to the house. The remaining four lock themselves in a lab inside the house, but the zombies break in. Karma finds a hatch in the floor which she, Alicia and Rudy use to escape. Simon sacrifices himself to kill the zombies by shooting a barrel of gunpowder, blowing up the house and the zombies. Alicia, Rudy and Karma find themselves in tunnels. They make their way through the tunnels, but Karma is killed by zombies as she attempts to hold them off as Rudy and Alicia flee.

Alicia and Rudy are aided out of the tunnels by a mysterious man wearing Greg's face as a mask. The man is revealed to be Castillo Sermano, who then orders a horde of zombies to restrain Alicia and Rudy in an attempt to kill them and use their flesh for his own purposes. Alicia and Rudy escape Castillo, blowing the tunnels up in the process. Castillo manages to survive the explosion and Alicia gets into a sword fight with him. Castillo impales her heart, and Rudy manages to decapitate him soon after. However, the still-alive headless body of Castillo begins to strangle Rudy. Alicia, who is barely alive, gets up and crushes the head under her foot, which finally kills him. Although Alicia seemingly dies, she and Rudy are rescued by a team of agents. The agents ask for Rudy's name, to which he responds with "Rudolph Curien" (implying this film is a prequel to The House of the Dead arcade game). The ending narration reveals that Rudy gave Alicia the immortality serum. The two survivors return home.

Cast

 Jonathan Cherry as Rudy
 Tyron Leitso as Simon
 Clint Howard as Salish
 Ona Grauer as Alicia
 Ellie Cornell as Casper
 Will Sanderson as Greg 
 Enuka Okuma as Karma
 Kira Clavell as Liberty
 Sonya Salomaa as Cynthia
 Michael Eklund as Hugh 
 David Palffy as Castillo
 Jürgen Prochnow as Kirk

Adam J. Harrington and Colin Lawrence portray Rogan and G, the protagonists of the first game. Matt and Johanna, the first victims of the zombie attack, are played by Steve Byers and Erica Durance. Jay Brazeau, Bif Naked, and Kris Pope appear as a captain, DJ, and raver, respectively. Elisabeth Rosen, who appeared in director Uwe Boll's previous film Heart of America, plays Skye. Sega of America President Peter Moore and House of the Dead game producer Rikiya Nakagawa make uncredited cameos as zombies.

Production
A The House of the Dead film had first been in development in 1998 at DreamWorks Pictures, with Jesse Dylan directing and Mark Verheiden writing the screenplay. The story would've been a loose adaptation, in which a group of zombies are the most popular kids in college and a group of nerds must defeat them.

In May 2002, it was announced filming began on an adaptation of House of the Dead from a script by Dave Parker and Mark A. Altman. Representatives from Sega shot alongside the production to secure images, motion capture, and gather other materials for The House of the Dead 4.

Music

Soundtrack

The film's soundtrack was released in late 2003 through ZYX Records. The album featured many bands from Boll's home country of Germany.

Track listing

Music video
A music video for the song "This Is Real" by Swiss pop singer Rey Thomas was also released as part of the publicity campaign. The clip was shot on location on the original set, parallel to the shooting of the movie, and shows the artist, who is himself made up as a zombie, in the midst of a group of dancing zombies from the film. This parody-like part was contrasted in a parallel montage of numerous, extremely violent scenes featuring the original cast, which caused many broadcasters to refuse to play the clip in heavy rotation.

Songs that are not included on the soundtrack album
 "Fury (House of the Dead)" by Black Tiger
 "Danger" by Oliver Lieb featuring Keith Flint
 "Zombie Island" and "Abu Dhabi" by Codetrasher
 "The Rotten Smell" by The Horror Boogies

Score

The film's score was composed by German composer Reinhard Besser. Besser would later compose the score for another Boll film in 2005 with Alone in the Dark. The score was released on March 29, 2013 through Playground Worldwide.

Track listing

Release 
House of the Dead was shown at the San Diego Independent Film Festival on February 15, 2003.

House of the Dead was released theatrically in the United States on October 10, 2003.

A director's cut of the film was released on DVD on September 9, 2008 distributed by Lionsgate Home Entertainment. This version features new dialogue, alternative takes, pop-up commentary and animation from the original video game.

Reception

Box office
House of the Dead grossed $10.2 million in the United States and Canada, and $3.6 million in other countries, for a total gross of $13.8 million, against its budget of $12 million.

In its opening weekend the film grossed $5.7 million, finishing sixth at the box office.

Critical response

On Rotten Tomatoes the film was ranked as the 41st of the 100 worst reviewed films of the 2000s, with an approval rating of  based on  reviews. The site's consensus reads, "A grungy, disjointed, mostly brainless mess of a film, House of the Dead is nonetheless loaded with unintentional laughs." On Metacritic the film has a score of 15 out of 100, based on 15 critics, indicating "overwhelming dislike". In 2009, Time listed the film on their list of top ten worst video game movies of all-time.

IGN gave it three out of five stars, citing it as "an unabashed B-movie that does an incredibly decent job with a limited budget, unknown cast, and routine storyline.

Sequel 
A sequel to the film, titled House of the Dead 2, was first shown at the Sitges Film Festival in Spain on October 14, 2005. It premiered on Sci Fi on February 11, 2006. Cornell was the only actor from the first film to star in the sequel.

See also 
 List of films based on video games

References

External links
 Official movie website
 
 
 
 
 Coverage at Random Action Hour

2003 films
2000s action horror films
2003 horror films
American action horror films
American zombie films
Artisan Entertainment films
Brightlight Pictures films
Lionsgate films
2000s English-language films
Films directed by Uwe Boll
Films set on fictional islands
Films set in forests
Films set in Seattle
Films shot in Vancouver
Films set in abandoned houses
The House of the Dead
Live-action films based on video games
Films based on Sega video games
2000s American films